Sin Town is a 1929 American silent Western film directed by J. Gordon Cooper and William K. Howard and starring Elinor Fair, Ivan Lebedeff and Hugh Allan. It is a contemporary-set Western, in which two World War I veterans are wrongly accused of killing a rancher and arrested for murder. With the help of the rancher's daughter they escape and capture the real culprit.

Plot summary 
"Silk" Merrick (Hugh Allan) and "Chicken" O'Toole (Jack Oakie) are two World War I veterans who head West.  The two friends find themselves accused of murdering a local rancher.  Merrick escapes from jail and helps another rancher burn down Sin Town.  Merrick frees O'Toole from jail, captures the real murderer, and the two of them settle down with Mary Barton, the murdered rancher's daughter.

Cast
 Elinor Fair as Mary Barton  
 Ivan Lebedeff as Pete Laguerro  
 Hugh Allan as "Silk" Merrick
 Jack Oakie as "Chicken" O'Toole
 Bob Perry as "Slippery" Simpson

Production 
In the scenes of burning Sin Town, the buildings that were burned were part of the Harold Lloyd studios, which was being cleared to make room for University of California, Los Angeles (UCLA).

References

External links 
 

1929 Western (genre) films
Films directed by William K. Howard
1929 films
American black-and-white films
Silent American Western (genre) films
1920s English-language films
1920s American films